Saunags (Livonian: Sǟnag) is a populated place in Kolka Parish, Talsi Municipality, Latvia, located  from the Cape Kolka, within the borders of Slītere National Park. The name derived from Livonian Sǟnag – pike perch (Sander), a local fish. First mentioned in documents in 1310, it is the oldest of the twelve Livonian villages on the Livonian Coast. It consists of two parts - Saunags and Dižsaunags, the later being the oldest and more preserved one. Located along the coast of the Baltic Sea and formerly inhabited by Livonian people.

History and local landmarks 
Saunags is at the same latitude as Gothenburg (Sweden) and the same longitude as Turku (Finland), both important ancient regional trading and cultural centres. Although far from large towns and sparsely populated, this coastal area had strategic importance in many wars because of its proximity to Irbe Strait, the main sea route to Riga. As a result, the nearby seabed is dotted with medieval to modern shipwrecks. During the Crimean war the British navy landed and burned down a military outpost of the Russian Empire. In the First World War the Russian navy placed a large number of naval mines off-shore - largest such emplacement at that point in  Baltic Sea history. This led to many German ships being destroyed here. During the Second World War German guns located here and opposite at Saaremaa island controlled the Irbe Strait.

After World War II, this area became the Soviet western border. There remains a USSR border guards tower, projector light, and small security house (the only one still standing). 
An old road, located behind the dunes parallel to the coast, connects Dižsaunags with the former lighthouse (as the light is dismantled, the tower now functions as the Saunagciema navigational sign) in the direction of Vaide. Along the route is Akacija estate and a few abandoned German and Soviet military bunkers. During World War II and after, it was used as a military supply route by Soviet border guards, as well as coast guards servicing the lighthouse. A coastal narrow gauge railway was planned here linking Pitrags and Mazirbe, but was left unfinished during World War I. This historic forest road is still used occasionally by local residents.

According to a local legend, there is a Medieval burial ground on the outskirts of the village in the direction of Vaide, however archeological works conducted in 2012 did not find any burials there (except just some pets). Next to this site lay the ruins of the first Soviet military base built by troops of Baltic Military District soon after World War II.

Although situated in a coastal environment, Saunags is home to a very large lime tree on Niglini estate, and a group of very large black alder (Alnus glutinosa) trees on Kalnbunkas estate. According to a Latvian registry listing all great or largest trees, Saunags is the only locality with two species large trees in one place.

The village can be accessed from the main asphalted road or via the old forest road connecting Saunags with Vaide and Pitrags. There are signs on the forest road marking the borders of Saunags.

Former and present landowners 
Most of the land in this area, as well as neighbouring areas, for many centuries, until 1918 belonged to the Baron Osten-Sacken family, a fairly important local Baltic-German noble dynasty. Their main seat was Dundaga Castle (former name Dundagen). After 1905 upraising local fishermen were gradually allowed to acquire land plots and their houses from the baron.

In 1731 Dundaga manor book stated three estates in Saunags: Buncke Pritiz (present name Kalnbunkas), Melcke Ans and Walke Angeck. According to local elders, it is likely that Bunke Pritiz is the first and the oldest settlement on the whole Livonian coast. It is supported by the fact that this is the location of the oldest trees as well as that the house itself is located at the highest point in the area. Curiously, the nearby forest opening, plot of land between Jaunpakalni's sauna building and Akacijas (now part of Niglini estate), was a well-known area for all local Livonian celebrations for centuries (the opening gradually overgrown with trees over the last 20 years).

In the past, Saunags was mainly populated by fishermen and farmers; today, historic wooden properties are mainly used as summer houses (or dachas). Akacijas estate (former Rupnieki) is the site of former local fish processing and salting plant owned by Kārlis Tilmanis, well known canned fish brand in Latvia between two World Wars. Tilmanis family fled by fishing boat to Sweden in 1945. Only ice storage inside the dune and skeleton wooden pier still remains. The other large estates are Jaunpakalni (include former Pakalni, Kalnbunkas and part of former Niglini), Krumini and Niglini. There is a small private Ethnographic Museum on Jaunpakalni estate, which includes restored old boat "Pakalni" used for fishing for over 50 years in local waters (viewings are by appointment only). Former fishermen barn, where all chandlery was kept, as well as winter repair wharf, were located symmetrically on the left and right side accordingly of Kalnbunkas' private approach road. Only foundations now remain, although there are plans in place to re-construct them together with the timber pier.

700th anniversary 
In 2010 Saunags celebrated its 700th birthday (since first mentioned in documents in year 1310). To mark this anniversary some local summer residents followed old Livonian routes by sea on motor yacht "Kolka" from Riga via Ruhnu and Saaremaa islands and Kolka to Saunags, where they disembarked from anchored boat. Memorial sign "DIŽSAUNAGS" was placed on the top of a sand dune nearby, between the two access roads to the beach.

References 

Travel notes and photos

See also 
Saaremaa
Livonian people
Livonian coast

Towns and villages in Latvia
Talsi Municipality
Courland
1310